Hobart Sky Ranch Airport  is a public-use airport located two miles (3 km) northwest of the central business district of Hobart, a city in Lake County, Indiana, United States. This airport is privately owned by Don Niemeyer.

Facilities 
 Runway 18/36: 3,125 x 40 ft (952 x 12 m), Surface: Asphalt

Runway 
The Runway at Hobart Sky Ranch (18/36) is poorly maintained. Currently, there are cracks throughout the runway/taxiway surfaces with grass growing between the cracks. The markings on the runway have faded away.

References

External links 

Airports in Lake County, Indiana
1940 establishments in Indiana
Airports established in 1940